Monetary reform, the reform of monetary creation and thus of the banking system, is a topical political issue in the United States, especially in light of the public debt (15 trillion dollar in November 2011), household debt (student debts, etc.), Social Security and other public sector undertakings and state debts. The financial crisis that began in U.S. in the fall of 2007 and subsequently affected large parts of the world, and was followed by massive bank rescues (so-called bailouts), also plays a major role in this context as well as criticism of Federal Reserve.

Strictly speaking, there are two separate movements for monetary reform in the U.S., one is more left-wing and the other is more right-wing. In Congress these views are represented mainly by Dennis Kucinich, who belong to the progressive left, and Ron Paul, known right-wing "Fed critic." The debate often focuses on questions such as how the banking system works today, debts, bailouts, the Federal Reserve, and more. But history is also alive in the debate, for example is Abraham Lincoln's so-called Greenbacks something that often is mentioned. The main American organization for "monetary reform" is the American Monetary Institute.

History

1600-1860 
During the 17th and 18th century the situation was largely reversed compared to today, because several colonies then had their own currencies. This disturbed the British financiers and in the late 18th and early 19th century they worked to gain acceptance in the Congress for the idea of an American/United States-central bank modelled by the Bank of England. Several of the U.S. Constitution fathers objected, however, saying that the colonies should be allowed to maintain their own monetary system. The fight was won in the end of the British bankers and their allies, and in 1781 the Bank of North America was founded, America's first central bank. However, it was not a real central bank since it only operated in three states and in 1791 was replaced by the First Bank of the United States. From 1811 to 1816, the United States had no central bank at all, then the Second Bank of the United States 1816-1836, and after that another period without a central bank from 1837 to 1862. Monetary reform during the 19th century in the US largely focused on the goal of keeping the local money and criticism of the central bank. One of the harshest critics were Andrew Jackson, the country's seventh president, who said that the central bank concentrated the nation's financial strength in a single institution, that it made the rich richer, that it gave power to the bankers instead of Congress, that the country became controlled from outside (read: from British financiers) and the northeastern states were favored at the southern and western states expense.

1860-1913 
At the end of November 1910, Senator Nelson W. Aldrich and Assistant Secretary of the U.S. Treasury Department A. Piatt Andrew, and five of the country's leading financiers (Frank Vanderlip, Henry P. Davison, Benjamin Strong, and Paul Warburg) arrived at the Jekyll Island Club to discuss monetary policy and the banking system. They created the Federal Reserve during this meeting. According to the Federal Reserve Bank of Atlanta, the 1910 Jekyll Island meeting resulted in draft legislation for the creation of a U.S. central bank. Parts of this draft (the Aldrich plan) were incorporated into the 1913 Federal Reserve Act.

1913-2008 
In the 1930s, during the Great Depression and especially before the Second World War, there were a lot of discussions about the banking system and how to improve it. The most well-known proposal for a big reform during this time is the so-called Chicago plan.

2008- 
The Need Act, presented in the House of Representatives in September 2011 by Dennis Kucinich, is a proposed law that implies that "the creation of money by private financial institutions as interest-bearing debts should cease once and for all".

See also

 Monetary reform in Britain
 New Economy movement
 Black Friday (1869) - also referred to as the Gold Panic of 1869

References 

Monetary reform